Johnson Lam Man-hon is a Permanent Judge of the Hong Kong Court of Final Appeal.

Biography

Early life and education

Lam was born in Hong Kong in 1961. He obtained an LL.B. and P.C.LL. from the University of Hong Kong in 1983 and 1984 respectively. Among his graduating class was his future judicial colleague Andrew Cheung.

Legal career

Lam was called to the Bar in Hong Kong in 1984 and was in private practice since 1985.

Lam joined the Judiciary as District Judge in 2001.

Lam was appointed as Judge of the Court of First Instance of the High Court in 2003. He served as President of the Lands Tribunal from 2003 to 2009. In 2011, he was appointed as the Judge in charge of the Constitutional and Administrative Law List.

In 2012, Lam was elevated to the Court of Appeal. He continued to serve as Judge in charge of the Constitutional and Administrative Law List until he was appointed as Vice President of the Court of Appeal on 2 September 2013.

He is currently Chairman of the Judiciary's Working Party on Mediation, as well as a member of the Steering Committee on Mediation and the Accreditation Sub-committee set up by the Secretary for Justice.

On 12 May 2021, it was announced that the Chief Executive had accepted the recommendation of the independent Judicial Officers Recommendation Commission to appoint Lam as a Permanent Judge of the Court of Final Appeal (a post which had become vacant upon the appointment of Andrew Cheung as Chief Justice of the Court of Final Appeal on 11 January 2021), subject to the endorsement of the Legislative Council in accordance with Article 90 of the Basic Law. Lam's appointment took effect on 30 July 2021.

Lam was appointed by the Chief Executive as a member of the Law Reform Commission of Hong Kong for 3 years with effect from 1 September 2021.

References

Alumni of King's College, Hong Kong
Living people
Hong Kong judges
1961 births